Jürg Biner (born 15 August 1964) is a Swiss freestyle skier. He competed at the 1992 Winter Olympics and the 1994 Winter Olympics.

References

External links
 

1964 births
Living people
Swiss male freestyle skiers
Olympic freestyle skiers of Switzerland
Freestyle skiers at the 1992 Winter Olympics
Freestyle skiers at the 1994 Winter Olympics
People from Zermatt
Sportspeople from Valais
20th-century Swiss people